

Hans-Georg Herzog (10 September 1912  – 20 July 1959) was an officer in the Wehrmacht of Nazi Germany during World War II who commanded the 5th Panzer Division. He was a recipient of the  Knight's Cross of the Iron Cross with Oak Leaves.

Herzog surrendered to the Red Army troops in the course of the Soviet 1945 East Prussian Offensive. Convicted in the Soviet Union as a war criminal, he was held until 1955.

Awards and decorations
 Iron Cross (1939) 2nd Class (14 June 1940) & 1st Class (29 April 1941)
 Honour Roll Clasp of the Army (27 September 1943)
 German Cross in Gold on 30 July 1942 as Oberleutnant in the 1./Schützen-Regiment 13
 Knight's Cross of the Iron Cross with Oak Leaves
 Knight's Cross on 6 April 1944 as Major of the Reserves and commander of II./Panzer-Grenadier-Regiment 14
 Oak Leaves on 23 March 1945 as Oberstleutnant of the Reserves and commander of Panzergrenadier-Regiment 14

References

Citations

Bibliography

 
 
 

1912 births
1959 deaths
Recipients of the Knight's Cross of the Iron Cross with Oak Leaves
German prisoners of war in World War II held by the Soviet Union
German Army officers of World War II
Recipients of the Gold German Cross
People from Grodków